Lynch's Brickyard House is a historic home located at Lynchburg, Virginia.  It consists of a dwelling built about 1849 and two garages built about 1922, all of which are constructed directly on the lot line along Jackson Street. The dwelling is a one-story, three-bay frame structure with a stone pier foundation, weatherboard siding, and metal gable roof with exterior-end chimneys.  The house is a rare surviving example of the modest, vernacular-style dwellings built in Lynchburg in the mid 19th century by artisans, tradesmen and other middle-class settlers.

It was listed on the National Register of Historic Places in 2002.

References

Houses on the National Register of Historic Places in Virginia
Houses completed in 1849
Vernacular architecture in Virginia
Houses in Lynchburg, Virginia
National Register of Historic Places in Lynchburg, Virginia
1849 establishments in Virginia